Cardano may refer to:

 Gerolamo Cardano (1501–1576), Italian mathematician and physician
 Fazio Cardano (1444–1524), Italian jurist and mathematician, father of Gerolamo
 Cardano al Campo, town in Lombardy
 11421 Cardano, minor planet
 Cardano (blockchain platform)

See also
 Cardano's method of solving a cubic equation
 Baguenaudier, aka Cardano's rings, mechanical puzzle
 Cardanus (crater), lunar crater
 Cardona (disambiguation)